The Roman Catholic Diocese of Kokstad is a diocese located in the city of Kokstad in the Ecclesiastical province of Durban in South Africa.

History
 April 8, 1935: Established as Apostolic Prefecture of Mount Currie from the Apostolic Vicariate of Mariannhill
 July 11, 1939: Promoted as Apostolic Vicariate of Kokstad
 January 11, 1951: Promoted as Diocese of Kokstad

Special churches
The cathedral is the St. Patrick's Cathedral in Kokstad.

Leadership
Prefect Apostolic of Mount Currie
 Father Biagio Sigibaldo Kurz, O.F.M. (1935 – 1939.07.11)
Vicars Apostolic of Kokstad 
 Bishop Biagio Sigibaldo Kurz, O.F.M. (1939.07.11 – 1948.05.21), appointed Prefect of Lingling [Yungchow], China
 Bishop John Evangelist McBride, O.F.M. (1949.04.21 – 1951.01.11)
 Bishops of Kokstad
 Bishop John Evangelist McBride, O.F.M. (1951.01.11 – 1978.05.15)
 Bishop Wilfrid Fox Napier, O.F.M. (1980.11.29 – 1992.05.29), appointed Archbishop of Durban in 1992 (cardinal in 2001)
 Bishop William Slattery, O.F.M. (1993.11.17 – 2010.12.23), appointed Archbishop of Pretoria and Bishop of South Africa, Military
 Bishop Zolile Peter Mpambani, S.C.I. (2013.05.06 – 2020.04.01), appointed Archbishop of Bloemfontein
 Bishop Thulani Victor Mbuyisa, C.M.M. (2022.04.06 – present)

See also
Roman Catholicism in South Africa

Sources
 GCatholic.org
 Catholic Hierarchy

Kokstad
Christian organizations established in 1921
Roman Catholic dioceses and prelatures established in the 20th century
1921 establishments in South Africa
Kokstad
Roman Catholic Ecclesiastical Province of Durban